, also known as (UR), is a semipublic Independent Administrative Institution, and is an agency responsible for Japanese housing. It provides housing at rates pegged to the market, but without the fees associated with private renting in Japan (key money, renewal fee) or the need for a guarantor. As of 2014, it managed around 750,000 rental properties across Japan.

History
It was founded in 1955 as the Japan Housing Corporation (Nihon Jūtaku Kōdan) to address the country's housing shortage due to post-war urbanisation. It was combined with other government organisations including the Japan Regional Development Corporation and semi-privatized in 2004 during the administration of Prime Minister Junichiro Koizumi (2001–06). The agency gave rise to the development of Danchi housing found in urban areas of post-war Japan.

References

External links
  (English)
 Profile (English)
 

Companies based in Yokohama